Fiorenzo di Lorenzo ( 1440 – 1522) was an Italian painter, of the Umbrian school. He lived and worked at Perugia, where most of his authentic works are still preserved in the Galleria Nazionale dell'Umbria.

Fiorenzo is known from a few signed works, including the Madonna of the Recommended (1476) and a niche with lunette, two wings and predella (1487), as well as from the documentary evidence that he was decemvir of that city in 1472, in which year he entered into a contract to paint an altarpiece for the church of Santa Maria Nuova, the pentatych of the Madonna and Saints.

Of his birth and death and pupilage nothing is known. Renaissance art biographer Giorgio Vasari does not even mention Fiorenzo's name, though he probably refers to him when he says that Cristofano, Perugino's father, sent his son to be the shop drudge of a painter in Perugia, who was not particularly distinguished in his calling, but held the art in great veneration and highly honoured the men who excelled therein. Certain it is that the early works both of Perugino and of Pinturicchio show certain mannerisms which point towards Fiorenzo's influence, if not to his direct teaching.

The list of some fifty pictures which modern critics have ascribed to Fiorenzo includes works of such widely varied character that the scholars' suggestions of the masters under whom Fiorenzo is supposed to have studied varies. Pisanello, Verrocchio, Benozzo Gozzoli, Antonio del Pollaiuolo, Benedetto Bonfigli, Andrea Mantegna, Francesco Squarcione, Filippo Lippi, Luca Signorelli and Domenico Ghirlandaio have all been mentioned.

According to the Encyclopædia Britannica Eleventh Edition :

Notes

References

1440s births
1522 deaths
People from Perugia
15th-century Italian painters
Italian male painters
16th-century Italian painters
Umbrian painters